Yun Seok-cheol (born April 10, 1985) is a South Korean jazz pianist, composer and record producer. Coming to prominence in the Korean jazz scene as part of the Yun Seok Cheol Trio, he is also a member of the band Temperature of Saying Hi, as well as a producer under the name The Blank Shop. He has appeared in various radio and television programs in South Korea including You Hee-yeol's Sketchbook, Sunny's FM Date, and EBS Space Gonggam.

Biography 
Yun Seok-cheol was born in Seoul, South Korea.  He attended Daejin High School and majored in jazz at JEI University.
He began playing in local jazz clubs at the age of 20, hosting a jam night at Club Evans in Hongdae, Seoul for more than seven years.
He won first place at the Ulsan Jazz Festival in 2005 and won third place at the Jarasum International Jazz Festival competition in 2008. 

Along with bassist Kim Sang-yee and drummer Kim Yong-jin, he is a member of the Yun Seok Cheol Trio, which was formed with the desire to "create a jazz group that felt like a rock or indie band".
They released their first album, Growth, in 2009 and released their second album Love is a Song in 2013. In 2018, they released the D Flat in April, an EP containing new tracks as well remakes of old songs.

Yun is active in the K-pop scene as a producer and session musician, working with singers such as Zion.T, Beenzino, Jang Hye-jin, Sam Kim, Kwon Jin-ah and Baek Yerin. His best known composition is arguably "Just" by Crush and Zion.T, which debuted atop the Gaon Digital Chart in 2015 with an eventual chart run of 35 weeks. His production work fuses elements of jazz, hip-hop and electronic music.

He joined You Hee-yeol's music label Antenna in March 2019. On September 17, 2020, he released Tailor, his first album under the producer alias The Blank Shop. It featured guest appearances from Sunwoojunga, 10cm, Ha Heon-jin, Wonpil, Yerin Baek, Cadejo, Lee Jin-ah, and Hello Ga-Young.

Yun was previously a lecturer in the Practical Music Department at Dongduk Women's University and the Jazz Music Department at JEI University.
He currently lectures at Kukje University of Arts.

Discography

As a solo artist

As The Blank Shop

With Yun Seok Cheol Trio

With Temperature of Saying Hi

Awards, nominations and invitations 
 6th Ulsan Jazz Festival in 2005 – First place
 2nd Jarasum International Jazz Festival Competition in 2008 - Third place
 Nominated a 2009 'Rising Star' by Korean jazz magazine Jazz People
 Invited to Japan Takatsuki Jazz Festival
 Invited to Taichung Jazz Festival
 Nominated for Best Jazz Album at 2017 Korean Music Awards for Jayu Rhythm
 Nominated for Best Pop Album at 2021 Korean Music Awards for Tailor

Filmography

Web shows

References

External links 
 
 
 Yun Seok-cheol on Korean Wikipedia

Living people
South Korean jazz pianists
1985 births
21st-century pianists